Rabiul Alam was a Bangladeshi film actor. He was known for acting in comic roles. He appeared in over 100 movies.

Biography
Alam made his debut in Dhallywood with Akash Ar Mati in 1959. He also appeared in films like Nil Akasher Niche, Chowdhury Bari, Alor Michil, Gunda and Chhutir Ghonta.

Alam died in 1987.

Selected filmography
 Akash Ar Mati (1959)
 Nil Akasher Niche (1969)
 Chowdhury Bari (1972)
 Alor Michil (1974)
 Gunda (1976)
 Chhutir Ghonta (1980)

References

External links

1987 deaths
Bangladeshi male film actors
1939 births
People from Murshidabad district
Bengali Muslims
20th-century Bengalis
Male actors from West Bengal